Brendan O'Malley (born July 14, 1969) is an American writer and actor from Kingston, Rhode Island.

Early life and education 
A graduate of South Kingstown High School, O'Malley attended the University of Rhode Island and studied English, theater, and French. His first cousin is comedian Mike O'Malley, who was also the creator of Survivor's Remorse (2014) for which Brendan O'Malley wrote several episodes.

Career

Brendan O'Malley is a writer and actor, known as a writer for Survivor's Remorse (2014) as well as a reoccurring acting role in Burn Notice (2007) and Burn Notice: The Fall of Sam Axe (2011). O'Malley also had minor appearances in Law & Order.

Filmography

Film

Television

See also
List of people from Rhode Island

References

1969 births
Living people
Writers from Rhode Island
Male actors from Rhode Island
American male screenwriters
American television writers
American male television writers
People from Washington County, Rhode Island
American male television actors
21st-century American male actors
University of Rhode Island alumni
Screenwriters from Rhode Island
21st-century American screenwriters
21st-century American male writers